Harvey Lloyd da Costa was Chief Justice of the Bahamas from 18 November 1980 to 31 December 1981.

References 

Colony of the Bahamas judges
Year of birth missing
Year of death missing